Asbury is an unincorporated community in Dale County, Alabama, United States.

History
A post office operated under the name Asbury from 1890 to 1904.

Demographics
According to the returns from 1850-2010 for Alabama, it has never reported a population figure separately on the U.S. Census.

References

Unincorporated communities in Dale County, Alabama
Unincorporated communities in Alabama